MasterChef Uruguay is an Uruguayan competitive cooking game show based on the original British series of the same name, open to amateur and home chefs. Broadcast by Channel 10, debuted on April 3, 2017, it is presented by Diego González. Sergio Puglia, Laurent Lainé and Lucía Soria served as judges for the first three seasons, while in the fourth one, Ximena Torres replaced Soria.

Format 
The winner plays for a prize that includes chef training from Crandon Institute, a trip to Girona to go to learn for 3 days at El Celler de Can Roca, and UYU$200,000 in cash.

The competition takes place in the MasterChef soundstage located in La Aguada, Montevideo which includes a supermarket, a restaurant, and a large kitchen area with several cooking stations which is overlooked by a balcony.

Challenges 
In each episode the participants must overcome a challenge

 Mystery box: In this challenge, contestants have a box that hides ingredients or other things. With what they have in the box they have to cook a dish, without being able to go to the market to look for more ingredients. They can use all the ingredients they want from the box, be it one or all.
 Elimination Test: In this test will be the worst dishes of the previous test. They have to cook any dish, but that dish has to have a main ingredient chosen by the Chefs (in each elimination test the main ingredient will be different). In this test there is always only one loser, which is removed from MasterChef. This is the only test that is in every episode.
 Team Challenge: In this challenge the cooks are split into teams by team captains who is the one who chooses his teammates and who chooses what dishes to do. Captains are almost always the 2 winners of the previous test. Always in this challenge the judges are not the main Chefs but other people, generally several people.
 Challenge in pairs: In this test teams of two participants are formed. They have to make a dish chosen by each team. While one cooks the other stands to the side and can help you by talking and giving advice or warn you about something but cannot help you by cooking or touching something. After a certain time they rotate and the one who cooked, stands on one side talking to him and the other cooks. They always rotate more than 1 time.
 Master class: In this challenge, the contestants taste a dish cooked by a guest chef, and then they cook it with different ingredients for a certain time.

History 
The rumor that a Uruguayan version of MasterChef started in October 2016. In February 2017, the presenter and the judges were confirmed. The show debuted on April 3 of that year, while on Monday, May 8, in the chapter of that day, the second season of MasterChef was confirmed, it was also announced that the registrations for that edition would begin shortly and that people who signed up for the first season, they wouldn't need to do it again.

The day before the end of the first season of Masterchef, on Sunday, July 23, 2017, a special called Road to the Grand Final was broadcast. It showed the life of the 4 finalists MasterChef participants.

Series overview

1st season: 2017

Top 18

Elimination table 

  The concursant wins
  The concursant is finalist
  The concursant wins the challenge
  High performance
  Medium performance
  Bad performance
  (WT) Blue team wins (LT) Blue team loses
  (WT) Red team wins (LT) Red team wins
  Immunity
  Third worst performance in elimination
  Second worst performance in elimination
  Eliminated
  Quit
  Don't compete
  Returns

Spin-off editions

MasterChef Profesionales: 2018 
A spin-off featuring professional chefs as contestants. It premiered on August 20, 2018  and ended on November 27. It had 16 episodes.

The judges were Sergio Puglia, Lucía Soria, Laurent Lainé and Narda Lepes. The winner of this spin-off was Carlos Telechea.

MasterChef Celebrity: 2020 

A spin-off featuring celebrities, it debuted on September 1. The judges are Sergio Puglia, Laurent Lainé and Ximena Torres. The winner of this edition was the singer Aldo Martinez. On August 3, 2021, the second season premiered, with actress Paula Silva as the winner.

Awards and nominations

References 

MasterChef
Uruguayan reality television series
2010s Uruguayan television series
2017 Uruguayan television series debuts
Spanish-language television shows
2019 Uruguayan television series endings
2010s game shows
Cooking television series
Non-British television series based on British television series
Canal 10 (Uruguay) original programming